"Slender chubs" is also used for the genus Erimystax as a whole.

The slender chub (Erimystax cahni) is a species of ray-finned fish in the family Cyprinidae.
It is found only in the United States.

References

Erimystax
Fish described in 1956
Freshwater fish of the United States
Taxonomy articles created by Polbot
ESA threatened species